Martin Abraham (born 20 September 1978 in Moravská Třebová) is a retired Czech footballer, who played for the Czech Republic, Cyprus and Germany.

Career
Having played at youth level for Roubina Dolní Kounice and FC Zeman Brno, Abraham started his professional career with 1. FC Slovácko. After moving to Slovan Liberec with whom he won the 2005–06 Czech First League, he transferred to FK Mladá Boleslav. Abraham was called up to the Czech Republic national football team by Karel Brückner for the Euro 2008 qualification games on 7 October 2006 against San Marino and on 11 October 2006 against Ireland. He was an unused substitute in both games.

Abraham joined Sparta Prague in July 2007, signing a three-year contract for a fee of 15 million koruna. He scored his first goal for the club after entering the game as a substitute in a 4–1 league victory away at Viktoria Žižkov on 25 August 2007. Abraham's stay at Sparta was short-lived, playing only six league games before transferring to Prague derby rivals Slavia Prague in January 2008 for 10 million koruna. He played 12 games for Slavia in the second half of the 2007–08 Czech First League as the club became league champions.

Abraham joined Cypriot side AEK Larnaca FC in August 2008 on a one-year loan from Slavia Prague, in a deal containing a second-year buy option. He went on to sign for Zlín in the Czech 2. Liga on a six-month loan in January 2010.

In 2010, he was signed by SV Wehen. In 2012, Abraham signed with FC Bohemians 1905.

Honours

Club
Mladá Boleslav
 Czech First League: 2005–06

Slavia Prague
 Czech First League: 2007–08

References

External links 

1978 births
Living people
People from Moravská Třebová
Czech footballers
Czech expatriate footballers
Czech First League players
AC Sparta Prague players
FK Mladá Boleslav players
Czech expatriate sportspeople in Germany
SK Slavia Prague players
FC Slovan Liberec players
Expatriate footballers in Germany
AEK Larnaca FC players
Expatriate footballers in Cyprus
1. FC Slovácko players
SV Wehen Wiesbaden players
Bohemians 1905 players
1. FK Příbram players
Cypriot First Division players
3. Liga players
Association football midfielders
FSV Budissa Bautzen players
FC Fastav Zlín players
Sportspeople from the Pardubice Region